Lega Piemonte, whose complete name is , is a regionalist political party active in Piedmont. Established in 1987, it was one of the founding "national" sections of Lega Nord (LN) in 1991 and has been the regional section of Lega per Salvini Premier (LSP) in Piedmont since 2020.

Its leader is Riccardo Molinari, who is also LSP leader in the Chamber of Deputies.

Roberto Cota, who led the party from 2001 to 2016, was President of Piedmont from 2010 to 2014.

History

Early years
The party was founded in April 1987 by splinters from Piedmontese Union (Union Piemontèisa, UP) led by Gipo Farassino and Mario Borghezio. This group, which took the name of Piedmontese Autonomist Movement (Moviment Autonomista Piemontèis, MAP) and later Autonomist Piedmont (Piemont Autonomista, PA), wanted to make an alliance with Lega Lombarda of Umberto Bossi, in contrast with UP leader Roberto Gremmo.

PA participated in the 1989 European Parliament election as part of the coalition Lega Lombarda – Alleanza Nord. In 1989–1990 it took part to the process of integration of the Northern regionalist parties, ahead of regional elections, and, finally, in February 1991, it was merged into Lega Nord, taking the current name.

In 1994 Farassino fended off a challenge by Oreste Rossi and was narrowly re-elected national secretary.

In the 1996 general election the party obtained its highest result: 18.2%.

In 1997 Farassino was replaced as secretary by Domenico Comino.

Splits and recovery
In 1999 the party suffered a damaging split when Comino left the party over disagreements with Umberto Bossi, federal secretary of Lega Nord, and started his own party, which was integrated into the Autonomists for Europe (ApE) in 2000.

Troubled by splits and a huge loss of popular support (the party was reduced from 18.2% to 7.8% in just three years), LNP entered into the centre-right House of Freedoms coalition. From 2000 to 2005 the party took part to the regional government led by Enzo Ghigo (Forza Italia), which included LNP long-time leader Gipo Farassino as regional minister of Culture, while Roberto Cota was appointed President of the Regional Council.

In 2001 Cota was elected national secretary of LNP with the mandate of re-building the party.

Between 2006 and 2008 the party doubled its share of vote from 6.3% to 12.3%. Subsequently, Cota became floor leader of Lega Nord in the Chamber of Deputies.

In the 2009 European Parliament election LNP increased again its share reaching 15.7%, its best electoral result since 1996.

Cota President of Piedmont
In the run-up of the 2010 regional election, Cota was chosen as joint candidate for President by The People of Freedom (PdL) and Lega Nord.

During the campaign, Cota declared it was time to rewrite the history of Italian unification, that was led by the Kingdom of Sardinia under the House of Savoy, as even Camillo Benso di Cavour, Italy's first Prime Minister, did not intend to unify the whole Italian Peninsula and, later, favoured a federal reform of the new Kingdom of Italy: Piedmont was to be once again independent. Cota, a republican with no nostalgia for the monarchy, maintained that his message would do well and he would overcome the relative weakness of LNP if compared with Liga Veneta (Veneto) and Lega Lombarda (Lombardy). In Cota's view, most of his support would come from industrial workers, including those of Southern Italian descent, and Catholics embarrassed by incumbent President Mercedes Bresso's secularism.

In March Cota was narrowly elected President (he took 47.3% of the vote against Bresso's 46.9%) and LNP tripled the number of its seats in the Regional Council from four to twelve. Instrumental for Cota's victory were the strong showing of Beppe Grillo's Five Star Movement, which gained 3.7% of the vote mainly from centre-left voters, and the Catholic vote that tilted to Cota, disappointing the Union of the Centre, allied with Bresso in the election.

Cota was forced to resign in early 2014, due to irregularities committed in 2010 by one of its supporting lists in filing the slates for the regional election, and chose not to stand again. In the 2014 regional election Democrat Sergio Chiamparino was elected President of Piedmont and LNP was reduced to a mere 7.3% of the vote.

From Cota to Molinari
In February 2016, during a hard-fought national congress, Riccardo Molinari replaced Cota as national secretary. Molinari, who was supported by the new Lega Nord federal secretary Matteo Salvini, obtained 446 votes (55.1%) from delegates, while his opponent Gianna Gancia, the incumbent national president chiefly supported by Gianluca Buonanno MEP and her husband and party heavyweight Roberto Calderoli, 364 votes (44.9%). Subsequently, Stefano Allasia was elected president.

In the 2018 general election the party obtained 22.6% of the vote, its best result ever. However, in the 2019 regional election, the party exceeded that result, gaining 37.1% of the vote.

Popular support
The party has its strongholds in the outer provinces, as well as in rural and in mountain areas of Piedmont. In the 2010 regional election it won 25.3% in Cuneo, 24.4% in Vercelli, 21.6% in Verbano-Cusio-Ossola, 21.1% in Novara, 20.6% in Asti and 20.2% in Biella. In the more recent 2018 general election the party obtained 25-28% in the single-seat constituencies of southern Piedmont (Cuneo, Alba, Asti and Alessandria) and those of northern Piedmont (Novara, Biella and Verbania). 

The electoral results of Lega Nord Piemont in the Region are shown in the table below.

Leadership
Secretary: Gipo Farassino (1987–1997), Domenico Comino (1997–1999), Bernardino Bosio (1999–2001), Roberto Cota (2001–2016), Riccardo Molinari (2016–present)
President: Angelo Colli (1991–1992), Domenico Comino (1994–1997), Bernardino Bosio (1997–1999), Silvano Straneo (2000–2001), Oreste Rossi (2001–2004), Mario Borghezio (2004–2011), Gianna Gancia (2012–2016), Stefano Allasia (2016–2020)

External links
Official website

References

1987 establishments in Italy
Federalist parties in Italy
Lega Nord
Political parties established in 1987
Political parties in Piedmont